The Hungarian Super Cup is an annual association football match between the League (Nemzeti Bajnokság I) champions and the Cup (Magyar Kupa) winners.

Winners 

(*) due to violent incidents during the recent 1997–98 Magyar Kupa Final between MTK Budapest FC and Újpest FC.

Performances

Performances by club

See also 
Magyar Kupa

References 
 

3
Hungary